This is a list of roads that have quadrant route numbers or state route numbers assigned by PennDOT, the Pennsylvania Department of Transportation.


Capital Beltway (Harrisburg)
Derry Street
Interstate 76
Interstate 78
Interstate 81
Interstate 83
Interstate 283
Paxton Street
Pennsylvania Route 39
Pennsylvania Route 230
Pennsylvania Route 441
Pennsylvania Route 501
Pennsylvania Route 581
State Route 3015 (Dauphin County, Pennsylvania)
State Route 3017 (Dauphin County, Pennsylvania)
State Route 3020 (Dauphin County, Pennsylvania)
US 11
US 15
US 22
US 30
US 322
US 422

 
Susquehanna Valley